The Quintet is an album by V.S.O.P. It was compiled from two concert performances: one at the Greek Theatre, University of California, Berkeley, on July 16, 1977; the other at the San Diego Civic Theatre on July 18, 1977. The quintet were keyboardist Herbie Hancock, trumpeter Freddie Hubbard, drummer Tony Williams, bassist Ron Carter and saxophonist Wayne Shorter (on tenor and soprano). The album was originally released in October 1977 as a 2-disc LP by Columbia Records.

Reception
An excerpt from a review in the January 1978 issue of Downbeat is quoted on the back of the album and describes the performance:

What the audience applauds on this album transcends mere form, technique and instrumentation.  They were thrilled by the charisma generated by five masters who listened to one another's inner ears, spoke to each other at multiple levels, and, no matter how dense the musical content, conveyed their messages to the audience with amazing clarity.

Legacy
"Third Plane" and "Lawra" were released also on studio album Third Plane (1977), which Hancock, Carter and Williams had recorded a few days before, on July 13, 1977. "Third Plane" became one of Carter's most renowned compositions.

"Byrdlike" was originally recorded by Hubbard for his 1962's Ready for Freddie. Shorter also played on this version.

"Dolores" was originally recorded by Miles Davis Quintet (consisting of Shorter, Hancock, Carter and Williams) in 1967 and released on 1967's Miles Smiles.

"Jessica" was originally released on Hancock's Fat Albert Rotunda album, recorded in 1969.

"Little Waltz" is a song from Carter's Piccolo album, recorded in March 1977.

Track listing
Side 1
"One of a Kind" (Hubbard) – 9:27
"Third Plane" (Carter) – 7:19
Side 2
"Jessica" (Hancock) – 7:02
"Lawra" (Williams) – 9:43
Side 3
"Darts" (Hancock) – 8:54
"Dolores" (Shorter) – 11:31
Side 4
"Little Waltz" (Carter) – 9:33
"Byrdlike" (Hubbard) – 8:05

Personnel
Musicians
 Freddie Hubbard – flugelhorn, trumpet
 Wayne Shorter – soprano saxophone, tenor saxophone
 Herbie Hancock – piano, keyboards, vocals
 Ron Carter – double bass
 Tony Williams – drums

Production
 David Rubinson – producer
 Jeffrey Cohen – associate producer
 Fred Catero – recording engineer
 Bryan Bell – live audio engineer
 Chris Minto – assistant engineer
 Les D. Cooper – remote crew
 Dennis Mays – remote crew
 Shawn Murphy – remote crew
 Paul Sandweiss – remote crew
 Ray Thompson – remote crew
 Russ Anderson – design
 Herbie Green – design
 Bruce Talamon – photography
 Kaz Tsuruta – photography
 Conrad Silvert – liner notes

References

Herbie Hancock live albums
1977 live albums
Albums produced by Dave Rubinson
Columbia Records live albums